The Women's team time trial of the 2015 UCI Road World Championships took place in and around in Richmond, Virginia, United States on September 20, 2015. It was the fourth edition of the team time trial event for UCI Women's Teams.  was the defending champion, having won all three previous editions in 2012, 2013 and 2014.

Qualification
Invitations were sent to the 25 leading UCI Women's Teams in the UCI Team Ranking as of August 15, 2015. Teams that accepted the invitation within the deadline had the right to participate. Every participating team had the opportunity to register nine riders from its team roster, with the exception of stagiaires, and had to select six riders to compete in the event.

Also a few lower ranked American UCI teams were invited.

Teams that did not accept the invitation are listed below in italics.

Course
The course rolled off from Henrico County at Lewis Ginter Botanical Garden, originally the Lakeside Wheel Club, founded in 1895 as a gathering spot for turn-of-the-century cyclists. The opening kilometers raced through Richmond's historic Northside neighborhoods leading into downtown. The course continued east of Richmond down rural Route 5, which parallels the 50-mile Virginia Capital Trail. The first few kilometers were scenic, flat, open roads that eventually narrowed and went through Richmond National Battlefield Park, a historic Civil War site. The race re-entered the city through Shockoe Bottom, eventually making a hard right turn on Governor Street to ascend . At the top, the teams had to take a sharp left turn onto the false-flat finishing straight,  to the finish.

Schedule
All times are in Eastern Daylight Time (UTC−4).

Final classification

Notes

References

Women's team time trial
UCI Road World Championships – Women's team time trial
2015 in women's road cycling